The 1st series of So You Think You Can Dance premiered on 2 January 2010, beginning with one audition show which showed the auditions, choreography camp and introducing the top 14. Five elimination rounds were followed by a final, with performances and results shown on the same night. The winner's prize was the title "Britain's Favourite Dancer", £100,000 and a trip to Hollywood, where the winner would perform in the US series finale.

The finale of the first series was held on 13 February 2010. Robbie White was injured, and could not perform. Lizzie Gough finished third, Tommy Franzén was the season runner-up, but female jazz dancer Charlie Bruce ended up as the winner.

Judging panel
Former Strictly Come Dancing judge and choreographer Arlene Phillips and executive producer and creator of the show Nigel Lythgoe made up the original judging panel for series one. Louise Redknapp, Sisco Gomez and Priscilla Samuels were guest judges during the audition stages, alongside Phillips and Lythgoe.

Singer and dancer Louise Redknapp joined the panel as a permanent judge during the 'choreography camp' stage.

Choreographer and dancer Sisco Gomez became the fourth permanent judge. He joined the panel for the live shows, alongside Redknapp, Phillips and Lythgoe.

Auditions
The preliminary auditions for the first series of the show were held in major cities throughout the UK in October 2009. Participants for the show had to be aged between 18 and 35 and could be amateur dancers or professionals who are not currently engaged in a professional contract. The BBC promoted auditions for the show via its official website.

On 2 January 2010, they aired an audition episode. Audition guest judges were Priscilla Samuels, Sisco Gomez and Louise Redknapp. They showed different dancers all the time, good and bad. First, they showed auditions from London, and then from Manchester.

Choreography camp
The choreography camp is just like the Vegas week in the US. For this part, Louise Redknapp joined Lythgoe and Phillips as a main judge, and the choreographers were judging when the dancers were dancing their choreography. 100 dancers were invited to the Choreography Camp, and after the group choreographies, there were only 26 dancers in the end, and then, they picked out their top 7 guys and top 7 girls.

Challenges

Finals

Top 14 dancers

Male contestants

Female contestants

Elimination chart

Performance nights

Week 1 (9 January 2010)
Couple dances:

Group dance: Top 14: "Boogie Woogie Bugle Boy"—Cami Thompson (Broadway; Choreographer: Stephen Mear)
Musical guest: "The Way Love Goes"—Lemar (with guest dancers Boy Blue Crew)
Solos:

Eliminated:
Anabel Kutay
Chris Piper
New partners:
Hayley Newton and Drew McOnie

Week 2 (16 January 2010)
Couple dances:

Group dance: Top 12: "Ain't No Other Man"—Christina Aguilera (Jazz; Choreographer: Frank Gatson)
Musical guest: Broken Heels - Alexandra Burke
Solos:

Eliminated:
Chloë Campbell
Gavin Tsang

Week 3 (23 January 2010)
Group dances:

Couple dances:

Musical guest: "One Shot"—JLS
Solos: (the dancers that got into the bottom 4, performed the same solo again)

Eliminated:
Hayley Newton
Mark Calape

Week 4 (30 January 2010)
Group dances:

Couple dances:

Solos: (the dancers that got into the bottom 4, performed the same solo again)

Musical guest: "Blame It on the Girls"—Mika
Eliminated:
Yanet Fuentes
Drew McOnie

Week 5 (6 February 2010)
Couple dances:

Solos: (the dancers that got into the bottom 4, performed the same solo again)

Group dance: Top 6: "Big Spender (Wild Oscar Mix)"—Shirley Bassey (Broadway; Choreographer: Karen Bruce)
Musical guest: "I Got You"—Leona Lewis
Eliminated:
Mandy Montanez
Alastair Postlethwaite

Week 6 (Finale) (13 February 2010)
Group dance:

Couple dances:

Solos:

The judges' favourite routine of the season: Hayley Newton and Drew McOnie: "Speechless"—Lady Gaga (Contemporary; Choreographer: Rafael Bonachela)
Musical guest: "Morning Sun" Robbie Williams
Places:
3rd place: Lizzie Gough
Runner-up: Tommy Franzén
Winner: Charlie Bruce

Ratings
Overnight ratings are taken from Digital Spy and official ratings are taken from BARB.

References

External links

2010 British television seasons
So You Think You Can Dance (British TV series)

no:So You Think You Can Dance (UK)
pl:So You Think You Can Dance (Wielka Brytania)